Jacques Cartier was a federal electoral district in Quebec, Canada, that was represented in the House of Commons of Canada from 1867 to 1953.

It was created by the British North America Act, 1867. It was amalgamated into the Jacques-Cartier—Lasalle electoral district in 1952.

Members of Parliament

This riding elected the following Members of Parliament:

Election results

By-election: On Mr. Laflamme being named Minister of Inland Revenue, 9 November 1876

By-election: On Mr. Girouard being named Judge of the Supreme Court of Canada, 28 September 1895

By-election: On Mr. Monk being appointed Minister of Public Works, 10 October 1911

By-election: On Mr. Monk's resignation, 2 March 1914

By-election: On Mr. Lafortune's death, 19 October 1922

By-election: On Mr. Mallette's death, 17 April 1939

By-election: On Mr. Marier's acceptance of an office of emolument under the Crown, 24 August 1949

See also 

 List of Canadian federal electoral districts
 Past Canadian electoral districts

External links
Riding history from the Library of Parliament

Former federal electoral districts of Quebec